Torbalı is a district of İzmir Province of Turkey.

An ancient Ionian city, Metropolis, is found in the district. It was famous for its wines and religious sites, and had three sanctuaries in marble dedicated to the Roman Emperor Augustus and his foster child Germanicus, in an ancient theatre which dominates the valley.

Pieces of art found during the excavations are now exhibited in İzmir and Ephesus museums. The town has the remains of an old port and a few holiday complexes, and is set attractively against a pine forest.

Excavations 
In June 2021, archaeologists announced the discovery of a well-preserved 1,800-year-old marble statue of a woman standing on a pedestal in Torbalı district. The head and two arms of the statue were missing.

References

Populated places in İzmir Province
Former populated places in Turkey